Mae Pao is a village and tambon (subdistrict) of Phaya Mengrai District, in Chiang Rai Province, Thailand. The tambon contains 19 villages. In 2005 it had a population of 11,302 people.

References

Tambon of Chiang Rai province
Populated places in Chiang Rai province